Pullum is a surname. Notable people with the surname include:

Geoffrey K. Pullum (born 1945), British-American linguist
Joe Pullum (1905–1964), American singer-songwriter
Megan Pullum (born 1971), British lawyer
William Pullum (1887–1968), English physical culturist, strongman, and weightlifter